J'ai tant aimé...  is a 2008 documentary film.

Synopsis 
The documentary describes the life of a Moroccan woman employed as a prostitute in a military brothel by the French Colonial Army who took part in the Indochina War. Past 70, Fadma says she agreed to do the documentary so that France would recognize her as they do their veterans: "I too took part in the war".

References 

2008 films
French documentary films
2008 documentary films
Moroccan documentary films
First Indochina War films
Documentary films about prostitution
Films about prostitution in Morocco
2000s French films